The  is a diary written by Buddhist priest Kaigen that contains records written between 1532 and 1542, mainly of the restoration of Tsurugaoka Hachiman-gū ordered by Hōjō Ujitsuna. It describes in great detail the work, its organization and the actions of the later Hōjō clan during that period.

References 

Kamakura, Kanagawa
Late Middle Japanese texts
Hōjō clan